1984 Football Championship of Ukrainian SSR was the 54th season of association football competition of the Ukrainian SSR, which was part of the Soviet Second League in Zone 6. The season started on 31 March 1984.

The 1984 Football Championship of Ukrainian SSR was won by FC Nyva Vinnytsia. Qualified for the interzonal playoffs, the team from Vinnytsia Oblast did not manage to gain promotion by placing second in its group.

The "Ruby Cup" of Molod Ukrayiny newspaper (for the most scored goals) was received by SKA Odessa.

Format
The season consisted of two stages preliminary and final tournaments. During the preliminary tournament participants were split into two groups of 13 teams in each with the six best of each group qualifying for the championship group of the next stage and the seven worst played a consolation tournament. 

In the final stage of both championship and consolation tournaments teams played home and away only with teams of another group. The winner of championship tournament further participated in the Soviet Second League interzonal playoffs in an effort to gain promotion to the First League, while the worst team of consolation tournament relegated to amateurs.

Teams

Promoted teams
Dynamo Irpin – Champion of the Fitness clubs competitions (KFK) (debut)

Preliminary stage

Group 1

Location map

Final standings

Group 2

Location map

Final standings

Final stage

Championship tournament

Final standings

Consolation tournament

Final standings

Top goalscorers
The following were the top ten goalscorers.

See also
 Soviet Second League

Notes

External links
 1984 Soviet Second League, Zone 6 (Ukrainian SSR football championship). Luhansk football portal
 1984 Soviet championships (all leagues) at helmsoccer.narod.ru

1984
3
Soviet
Soviet
football
Football Championship of the Ukrainian SSR